Xie Zhiling (born 8 December 1963) is a Chinese sprinter. She competed in the women's 200 metres at the 1988 Summer Olympics.

References

External links
 

1963 births
Living people
Athletes (track and field) at the 1988 Summer Olympics
Chinese female sprinters
Olympic athletes of China
Place of birth missing (living people)
Olympic female sprinters